Oregon's 1st congressional district is a congressional district located in the U.S state of Oregon. The district stretches from Portland's western suburbs and exurbs, to parts of the Oregon coast. The district includes the principal cities of Beaverton, Hillsboro, and Tigard, all located in the Portland metropolitan area. Geographically, the district is located in the northwest corner of Oregon. It includes Clatsop, Columbia, Washington, and Yamhill counties, and a portion of southwest Multnomah County in Portland.

The district has been represented by Democrat Suzanne Bonamici since 2012. Bonamici won a special election to replace David Wu, who resigned in the wake of accusations of sexual misconduct.

Recent presidential elections

List of members representing the district

Recent election results 
Sources (official results only): 
Elections History from the Oregon Secretary of State website
Election Statistics from the website of the  Clerk of the United States House of Representatives

1996

1998

2000

2002

2004

2006

2008

2010

2012 special election

A special election was held on January 31, 2012, to replace the most recent incumbent David Wu, who created a vacancy in the office with his resignation effective August 3, 2011. The winner of the election, Suzanne Bonamici, served the remainder of Wu's two-year term.

2012

2014

2016

2018

2020

2022

Historical district boundaries

Following the 2000 United States Census, the district gained some of Multnomah County, which had previously been part of the 3rd district. After the 2010 United States Census, the district boundaries were changed to move Downtown Portland from the 1st to the 3rd district.

See also

Oregon's congressional districts
List of United States congressional districts

References
Specific

General

 Congressional Biographical Directory of the United States 1774–present

01
Clatsop County, Oregon
Columbia County, Oregon
Multnomah County, Oregon
Washington County, Oregon
Yamhill County, Oregon
1893 establishments in Oregon
Constituencies established in 1893